Athol Alexander Paul Rees Stuart (born 1881) was an English oarsman who won the Diamond Challenge Sculls at Henley, the Wingfield Sculls and the London Cup to achieve the rowing triple crown in 1909.

Stuart was the son of Montague Pelham Stuart, of Steynton, Surbiton and his wife Mary Rees. He was educated at Cheltenham College and spent two terms at Caius College, Cambridge.   In 1900 he became a Lieutenant in the 6th Battalion the Manchester Regiment and served in the Second Anglo-Boer War.

Stuart rowed for Kingston Rowing Club and was runner up to Alexander McCulloch in the Diamond Challenge Sculls at Henley Royal Regatta in 1908. He won the Diamond Challenge Sculls in 1909 beating R Lucas. Later in 1909 he won the Wingfield Sculls, beating Wally Kinnear.  Stuart also won the London Cup at the Metropolitan Regatta, winning the triple crown in the year.

Stuart served in the First World War as a captain and adjutant of the Manchester Regiment and a major in the Sherwood Foresters.

Stuart's brother Douglas Stuart was a Cambridge University and Olympic oarsman.

References

1881 births
British male rowers
People educated at Cheltenham College
Manchester Regiment officers
Sherwood Foresters officers
British Army personnel of the Second Boer War
British Army personnel of World War I
Year of death missing
Sportspeople from Gloucestershire